Exp is an Italian group which released several dance singles in the 1990s, great hits particularly in the discothèques.

Discography

Singles
 "Before the Night" (with Julia for the vocals) (1992) - #25 in France
 "Save Me" (1993)
 "Shake Your Body" (1993)
 "Welcome to the Dance" (1993) - #34 in France
 "The Sound (Keep Rolling)" (1994)

Songs not released as singles
 "She Said" (1994)
 "Step By Step" (1995)
 "Dream Of The Night" (1996)
 "Dunga! Dunga!" (1997)

Members
 Luca Galiati
 Jimmy Nicoli
 Mario Borgonovo
 Julia (singer)

References

External links
 Biography and discography
 Discography

Italian dance music groups
Musical groups established in 1992